The 2016 Bank of Communications OTO Shanghai Masters was a professional ranking snooker tournament that took place between 19 and 25 September 2016 at the Shanghai Grand Stage in Shanghai, China. It was the fifth ranking event of the 2016/2017 season.

Kyren Wilson was the defending champion, but he lost 2–5 to Michael Holt in the last 32.

Stephen Maguire made the 120th official maximum break in the third frame of his wildcard round match against Xu Yichen. It was Maguire's third professional maximum break.

Ding Junhui won the 12th ranking title of his career, defeating Mark Selby 10–6 in the final. He also became the first second-time winner in the history of the event.

Prize fund 

The breakdown of prize money from this year is shown below:

 Winner: £85,000
 Runner-up: £35,000
 Semi-final: £19,500
 Quarter-final: £12,000
 Last 16: £8,000
 Last 32: £6,000
 Last 48: £3,000
 Last 64: £2,000
 Last 96: £500

 Non-televised highest break: £200
 Televised highest break: £2,000
 Total: £465,200

The "rolling 147 prize" for a maximum break stood at £5,000 for the televised stage and at £10,500 for the qualifiers.

Wildcard round 

These matches were played in Shanghai on 19 and 20 September 2016.

Main draw

Final

Qualifying 

These matches were played between 30 August and 2 September 2016 at the Barnsley Metrodome in Barnsley, England. All matches were best of 9 frames.

Century breaks

Qualifying stage centuries 

 136, 110  Michael Holt
 134, 117  Jamie Curtis-Barrett
 134  Sam Craigie
 130  Jack Lisowski
 128, 118  Stuart Carrington
 128  Hamza Akbar
 127, 102  Zhang Anda
 123  Kurt Maflin
 119, 102  Jamie Jones
 118  Matthew Selt
 116, 103  Thor Chuan Leong

 116  Andrew Higginson
 115  Robin Hull
 114  Dominic Dale
 108, 100  Mei Xiwen
 104  Ian Preece
 104  Ross Muir
 103  Stephen Maguire
 103  Jamie Cope
 101  Adam Duffy
 101  Zhao Xintong

Televised stage centuries 

 147, 130, 121, 104  Stephen Maguire
 141, 135, 100  Stuart Carrington
 133  Anthony McGill
 124, 123, 112  Stuart Bingham
 120, 108, 102  Mark Selby
 119  Marco Fu
 117, 115  David Gilbert
 117  Mei Xiwen

 115, 103  Ding Junhui
 113, 101  Michael White
 111, 100  Yuan Sijun
 108, 107, 107, 102  Ryan Day
 107, 103, 101  Michael Holt
 104  Ali Carter
 101  Kyren Wilson
 100  John Higgins

References

External links 

2016
2016 in snooker
2016 in Chinese sport
September 2016 sports events in China